Darvell Huffman (born May 5, 1967) is a former American football wide receiver in the National Football League for the Indianapolis Colts. He played college football at Boston University and was drafted in the ninth round of the 1990 NFL Draft.

Playing career

College
Prior to attending Boston he attended Newton South High School in Massachusetts where he was a stand out in football. He was a walk on at Boston University. Huffman was AP Honorable Mention All American at Boston University

Professional 
Huffman played for the Indianapolis Colts, Canadian Football League and the Charlotte Rage of the Arena Football League.

Coaching career and other work
Huffman turned to coaching high school football at Cathedral High School in Indianapolis and Noblesville High School in Noblesville, Indiana. Huffman coached for 13 years.

National Football League Alumni Indianapolis Chapter  Secretary since 2002. January 23, 2014 the Indianapolis Chapter donated $35,000 I U Health Neuroscience.

References

External links
 Just Sports Stats

1966 births
Living people
Sportspeople from Boston
Sportspeople from Newton, Massachusetts
Players of American football from Boston
African-American players of American football
American football wide receivers
Boston University Terriers football players
Indianapolis Colts players
Charlotte Rage players
Coaches of American football from Massachusetts
African-American coaches of American football
High school football coaches in Indiana
21st-century African-American people
20th-century African-American sportspeople